Elias Carpenter Weekes (13 July 1809 – 5 August 1881) was an Australian ironmonger and politician. He was a member of the New South Wales Legislative Council between 1865 and 1880. He was also a member of the New South Wales Legislative Assembly  between 1856 and 1864. He served two terms as the Colonial Treasurer of New South Wales.

Early life
Weekes was the son of a shipwright at Chatham Dockyard. He had a rudimentary education and work in commercial occupations in England. Weekes emigrated to Sydney in 1837 and had established successful ironmongery and wine importation businesses by 1855. He was a director of The Bank of New South Wales. Philosophically a liberal, he became politically active during the 1840s and 1850s and opposed the conservative constitution proposed by William Wentworth. He was a member of the committee of the Anti-Transportation League and an alderman of the Sydney Municipal Council between 1850 and 1853.

Colonial Parliament
At the first election under the new constitution Weekes contested the seats of Cumberland (South Riding) and Northumberland Boroughs. He was elected for Cumberland (South Riding) but was defeated by Bourn Russell in Northumberland Boroughs. However, Russell's election was overturned on appeal and Weekes was declared elected and chose to represent the seat until it was abolished at the next election. He then represented West Maitland until 1864. In 1865, he accepted a life appointment to the Legislative Council.

Government
Weekes was the Colonial Treasurer of New South Wales in the second government of Charles Cowper between April and October 1859. He held the same position in the first Robertson and third Cowper governments between 1860 and 1863 when worsening eyesight forced him to resign from the government. He was a strong advocate of legislation to restrict Chinese immigration and opposed state aid to religious schools.

References

 

1809 births
1881 deaths
Members of the New South Wales Legislative Assembly
Members of the New South Wales Legislative Council
Treasurers of New South Wales
19th-century Australian politicians